The Witching Hour is a 1985 Spanish drama film directed by Jaime de Armiñán. The film was selected as the Spanish entry for the Best Foreign Language Film at the 58th Academy Awards, but was not accepted as a nominee.

Cast
 Francisco Rabal as César
 Concha Velasco as Pilar
 Victoria Abril as Saga
 Sancho Gracia as Rubén Blázquez y Delgado de Aguilera
 Asunción Balaguer as Monja
 Juan Echanove as Telmo

See also
 List of submissions to the 58th Academy Awards for Best Foreign Language Film
 List of Spanish submissions for the Academy Award for Best Foreign Language Film

References

External links
 

1985 films
1985 drama films
Spanish drama films
1980s Spanish-language films
Films directed by Jaime de Armiñán
Films with screenplays by Jaime de Armiñán
1980s Spanish films